The match between Uruguay and hosts Brazil was the decisive match of the final stage at the 1950 FIFA World Cup. The match was played at the Maracanã Stadium in the then-capital of Brazil, Rio de Janeiro, on 16 July 1950.

Unlike in other editions of the tournament, which conclude with a one-off final, the 1950 winner was determined by a final group stage, where four teams played in a round-robin format. With Brazil topping the group, one point ahead of Uruguay going into the final round of matches, Uruguay needed a win while Brazil needed only to avoid defeat to become the world champions; neither of the other two teams, Spain and Sweden, could finish first. The match is often regarded as the de facto final of the 1950 World Cup.

Uruguay won 2–1; Brazil took the lead shortly after half-time thanks to a goal by Friaça, but Juan Alberto Schiaffino equalised midway through the second half, and Alcides Ghiggia completed the comeback with 11 minutes remaining. A victory of an underdog over a heavily favoured side, the result is considered one of the biggest upsets in the history of football. The term Maracanaço (in Portuguese) or Maracanazo (in Spanish), roughly translated as "The Maracanã Smash", became synonymous with the match.

Spectated officially by 173,850 people and possibly by over 200,000, the Maracanazo remains the most highly attended football match ever played.

Background

The road to the title in the 1950 World Cup was unique; instead of a knockout stage, the preliminary group stage was followed by another round-robin group. Of the 16 teams slated to compete, only 13 arrived. The final four teams were Brazil (the host country and joint-top scorers from the group stage, coming from wins over Mexico and Yugoslavia and a draw against Switzerland), Uruguay (who only had to play one match in their group, an 8–0 win over Bolivia), Spain (who won all three of their group matches, against England, Chile and the United States), and Sweden (who qualified ahead of Paraguay and the defending world champions, Italy).

Brazil won both of their first two matches convincingly, beating Sweden 7–1 and Spain 6–1 to go top of the group with four points going into the final match. With three points, Uruguay were close behind in second place, although they had to come back from 2–1 down to draw 2–2 with Spain and beat Sweden 3–2, the winning goal coming just five minutes before the end of the game. The match between Brazil and Uruguay, on the other hand, would decide the title; a victory or a draw would grant Brazil the title, whereas Uruguay had to win the match in order to win the championship. Brazil had scored 23 goals in five games before the match with Uruguay, and had defeated both Spain and Sweden with larger margins than the Uruguayans had. As a result, Brazil was extremely confident of victory in the deciding match, with newspapers and politicians declaring victory before the game even began. 

The 1950 FIFA World Cup was the only version of the tournament to be played with a round-robin final round, and as such is the only FIFA World Cup to date to not have a deciding knock-out final. As it was the last game of the tournament, and the result of the match directly determined the winner, the match has come to be commonly referred to as the final, including by FIFA itself.

Anticipated celebration
The specialised press and the general public were so confident of victory, based on Brazil's almost indomitable form, that they had already started declaring Brazil the new world champions for days prior to the match. Newspapers such as the Gazeta Esportiva in São Paulo and O Mundo in Rio de Janeiro proclaimed victory the day before the game. Brazil had won their last two matches (Spain and Sweden) with a very successful attack-minded style of play. Uruguay, however, had encountered difficulties, managing only a draw against Spain and a narrow victory over Sweden. The comparison of those results seemed to show that the Brazilians were set to defeat Uruguay as easily as they had defeated Spain and Sweden.

Moreover, in the Copa América, also held in Brazil the previous year, the hosts had won by scoring 46 goals in just eight matches. Ecuador was beaten 9–1, Bolivia 10–1, and runners-up Paraguay were defeated with a margin of 7–0. Further, Brazil beat Uruguay 5–1.

Twenty-two gold medals were made with each player's name imprinted on them and the mayor of Rio, Angelo Mendes de Moraes, delivered a speech on the day of the game with the words: "You, players, who in less than a few hours will be hailed as champions by millions of compatriots! You, who have no rivals in the entire hemisphere! You, who will overcome any other competitor! You, who I already salute as victors!" A victory song, "Brasil Os Vencedores" ("Brazil the Victors"), was composed and practised, ready to be played after the final.

However, Paulo Machado de Carvalho, then a São Paulo FC leader, but later head of the Brazilian squad that won the World Cups of 1958 and 1962, opposed such premature claims of victory. During a visit to the training session at the Estádio São Januário on the eve of the game, Paulo found several politicians making impassioned speeches to the players, as well as journalists, photographers and others arriving to join the "future champions". When he warned coach Flávio Costa about the risk of upsetting the players' concentration, Paulo was ignored. Frustrated, he told his son Tuta, who was with him, "we are going to lose".

On the morning of 16 July 1950, the streets of Rio de Janeiro were bustling with activity. An improvised carnival was organised, with thousands of signs celebrating the world title, and chants of "Brazil must win!". This spirit was maintained right up until the final minutes of the match, which filled the Maracanã Stadium with a paid attendance of 173,850 and an actual attendance of up to 220,000 by some estimates, including thousands who entered the stadium illegally. This is an all-time record attendance for a football match that is unlikely to be broken in an era when practically all high-profile matches are held in all-seater stadiums; until its first great remodelling in 1999, the Maracanã was mostly concrete grandstands with no seats.

Uruguay's preparation
The Brazilian newspaper O Mundo printed an early edition on the day of the final containing a photograph of Brazil with the caption "These are the world champions". Disgusted with that, Uruguay's captain, Obdulio Varela, bought as many copies as he could, laid them on his bathroom floor and encouraged his teammates to spit and to urinate on them.

In the moments prior to the match, coach Juan López informed his team in Uruguay's dressing room that their best chance of surviving the powerful offensive line of Brazil would come through adopting a defensive strategy. After he left, Varela stood up and addressed the team himself, saying "Juancito is a good man, but today, he is wrong. If we play defensively against Brazil, our fate will be no different from Spain or Sweden". Varela then delivered an emotional speech about how they should go against all odds and not be intimidated by the fans or the opposing team. The speech, as was later confirmed, played a huge part in the outcome of the game. In response to his squad's underdog status, the captain delivered the memorable line, "" ("Boys, outsiders are just stickdolls. Let's start the show").

Match

Summary

The game began as form predicted, with Brazil attacking against the Uruguayan defensive line for the majority of the first half. Unlike Spain and Sweden, however, the Uruguayans managed to maintain their defence and the first half ended scoreless. Brazil scored the first goal of the match only two minutes after the interval, with São Paulo forward Friaça shooting low past goalkeeper Roque Máspoli. After the goal, Varela took the ball and disputed the validity of the goal to the referee, arguing that Friaça was offside. Varela drew out this argument, going so far as to demand that the referee listen to him through an interpreter. By the time the conversation ended, the crowd had calmed down, then Varela took the ball to the center of the field, and shouted to his team, "Now, it's time to win!"

Uruguay managed to take control of the game. When faced with a capable Uruguayan attack, Brazil showed their frail defense, and Juan Alberto Schiaffino scored the equaliser in the 66th minute. Later, Alcides Ghiggia, running down the right side of the field, scored another goal, with a low shot that went just under goalkeeper Barbosa (who, having anticipated a cross from Ghiggia's position, dived a moment too late to stop the ball from rolling under him), with only 11 minutes remaining on the clock. The crowd was virtually silent after the second Uruguay goal until English referee George Reader signalled the end of the match with Uruguay winning 2–1.

Details

Aftermath

When the match ended, the stadium was filled with "disturbing and traumatic absolute silence." At least two Brazilian fans committed suicide inside the stadium and many suicides were reported across the country in the following days. In Brazil, many newspapers and fans refused to accept the fact that they had been defeated, and famous radio journalist Ary Barroso (briefly) retired. 

Brazil did later rebound and win back-to-back World Cups in 1958 and 1962. Two unused squad members of the 1950 team, Nílton Santos and Carlos Castilho, were also members of the victorious Brazil squads that were to come. Santos played in both finals whereas Castilho only played in the 1954 FIFA World Cup and in 2007 was posthumously awarded the 1958 and 1962 winning medals as a squad member, having been Gilmar's reserve in both tournaments. Four members of the team, the captain Augusto, Juvenal, Bigode and Chico never played for Brazil again. The already made 22 gold medals were discarded, never to be seen again, and the already composed song "Brasil Os Vencedores" was never performed.

Brazil's white shirts with blue collars that were worn in the final game were, in the wake of the defeat, subject to criticism by the country's sports federation for being "unpatriotic", with pressure mounting to change the colours. In 1953 and with the support of the Brazilian Sports Confederation, a competition was held by the newspaper Correio da Manhã to design a new outfit, with the rule being that it must incorporate the colours of the national flag. Eventually, the competition was won by newspaper illustrator Aldyr Garcia Schlee, who came up with the design of a yellow shirt with a green trim, blue shorts with white trim, and white socks. Schlee had initially been dettered from using all four colours, believing that yellow and white was too similar to the Holy See.

The new kit was first used in March 1954 against Chile, and has been used ever since. The runner-up design was a green shirt, white shorts, and yellow socks. When Brazil first won the World Cup in 1958, they wore their second kit as the new colours clashed with those of hosts Sweden.

"Phantom of '50"
The term "Phantom of '50" was later used to refer to the fear that Brazilians and Brazil national football team feel of the Uruguay national football team due to this loss. Each time Brazil and Uruguay play at Maracanã Stadium, the theme resurfaces.

In 1993, after losing important games, Brazil was struggling to qualify for the 1994 FIFA World Cup. The final match of the qualifying South American group between Brazil and Uruguay was tense, surrounded by fear, as Brazil needed to win the game to qualify. Brazil beat Uruguay by 2–0, with two goals by Romário, who had been ignored in the tournament and was urgently called in to save Brazil.

The theme reappeared in the Brazilian press as Uruguay qualified for the 2014 FIFA World Cup. Uruguay often emphasized the theme, giving the team motivation and encouragement in matches against Brazil. When Brazil hosted the 2014 World Cup and again had a hard defeat, this time a 1–7 humiliation in the semi-final with Germany in Belo Horizonte, the game was subsequently known as "Mineirazo", given it took place at the Mineirão stadium and echoed the same sense of defeat as in 1950. Tereza Borba, daughter of goalkeeper Moacir Barbosa, who was scapegoated for the defeat for years, said the 2014 loss was enough to redeem her father's legacy, and most of the Brazilian media took the opportunity to contrast the 2014 semi-final as an embarrassment compared to the close defeat in the Maracanazo. Ghiggia himself stated that while both games were traumatic, they could not be compared as the 1950 game had more at stake.

Ghiggia was the last surviving player from the game; he died on 16 July 2015, exactly 65 years after scoring the decisive goal, at the age of 88. Schlee died on 17 November 2018, aged 83.

See also
 Brazil–Uruguay football rivalry

References

External links
 El Maracanazo y la leyenda- Como explicar lo inexplicable

1
1950
1950

1950
World
FIFA World Cup matches
International sports competitions in Rio de Janeiro (city)
20th century in Rio de Janeiro
July 1950 sports events in South America
1950
Nicknamed sporting events